The Henderson–Metz House is located in the Fineview neighborhood of Pittsburgh, Pennsylvania. The house was built circa 1860, was listed on the National Register of Historic Places in 1979.

References

Houses completed in 1860
Houses on the National Register of Historic Places in Pennsylvania
Gothic Revival architecture in Pennsylvania
Houses in Pittsburgh
Pittsburgh History & Landmarks Foundation Historic Landmarks
National Register of Historic Places in Pittsburgh